Neville John "Noddy" Holder  (born 15 June 1946) is an English musician, songwriter & actor. He was the lead singer and rhythm guitarist of the English band Slade, one of the UK's most successful acts of the 1970s. Known for his unique and powerful voice, Holder co-wrote most of Slade's material with bass guitarist Jim Lea including "Mama Weer All Crazee Now", "Cum On Feel the Noize" and "Merry Xmas Everybody". After leaving Slade in 1992, he diversified into television and radio work, notably starring in the ITV comedy-drama series The Grimleys (1999–2001).

Early life and career
Neville John Holder was born on 15 June 1946 in the Caldmore area, near the centre of Walsall, Staffordshire, England. When he was seven he moved with his family to the Beechdale Estate, a council estate in the north of the town which was also home to Rob Halford. The son of a window cleaner, in 1957 Holder passed the eleven plus exam and attended a grammar school for a year until it closed. He then attended the new T. P. Riley Comprehensive School and passed six GCE O-level exams. He formed a group called the Rockin' Phantoms with school friends at the age of 13, and with money earned from a part-time job, he bought a guitar and an amplifier. He also used his father's  window-cleaning van to drive Robert Plant to gigs with Plant's band at the time, the Tennessee Teens. Holder started his own band called the Memphis Cutouts and then, with Steve Brett & the Mavericks in the early '60s, recorded four singles for EMI's Columbia label.

Slade

In 1966, drummer Don Powell persuaded Holder to join The N' Betweens, a group which already included guitarist Dave Hill and bass guitarist/ keyboard player/violinist/songwriter Jim Lea. Together they formed the band Ambrose Slade, eventually to become Slade, one of Britain's top-selling rock bands. Lea and Holder turned out to be the group's most successful song-writing partnership, composing almost all of the band's songs. The band clocked up 21 hit singles and released 15 albums with their original line-up.

Slade are particularly remembered for "Merry Xmas Everybody", written by Holder and Lea. Holder recorded the single with Slade in 1973, and the song became the band's sixth number one and the third Slade single to go straight in at number one in the UK Singles Chart. "Merry Xmas Everybody" has seen over one million copies being sold in the UK alone.

After 26 years with Slade, Holder left in 1992, to pursue a career away from music, with regular stints as radio presenter, television personality, actor and voice-over artist.

Other work
In 1980, after the death of Bon Scott, Holder was offered the chance to join AC/DC but declined because, as he put it; "my loyalty was to Slade".

During 1982, Holder branched into production and worked with his old school friend Phil Burnell and his band Three Phase on one single "All I Want To Do Is (Fall in Love With You)", which was the band's only release. Holder and Burnell produced the single together, and it was published under Noddy Holder Music Ltd./Whild John Music Ltd., and released via Speed Records. The single did not enter the UK chart, as it received limited promotion.

During late 1983, Holder did some production work with the American band The First, who came over to the UK from Boston, Massachusetts in America, especially to work with him, although there was never any release of material. In late 1983, both Holder and Lea produced Girlschool's cover of the T-Rex song "20th Century Boy" and then the parent album Play Dirty which featured two Slade tracks "Burning in the Heat of Love" and "High and Dry". The "High and Dry" track was originally written for Girlschool but still appeared on Slade's album that same year. In 1985, Holder co-wrote, and sang backing vocals on, the single "Citizen Kane" which Lea released under his own name.

In 1988, Holder recorded "Tear into the Weekend" for a Pepsi commercial in Canada. In 1989, Holder provided vocals to help out Dave Hill and his newly formed group Blessings in Disguise which also featured, Ex-Wizzard keyboard player, Bill Hunt, Craig Fenney and Bob Lamb. The debut single, released in 1989 for the Christmas market was a cover of The Everly Brothers "Crying in the Rain", backed by a Hill/Hunt composition, "Wild Nights". The band also recorded a cover of the Elvis Presley song "A Fool Such As I" which was not released. The follow-up and final Blessings in Disguise single, "Chance to Be" did not feature Holder.

Holder also appeared on the television panel game Pop Quiz, hosted by Mike Read.

Career since Slade

Since his departure from Slade in 1992, Holder has appeared on hundreds of TV shows, most notably the ITV comedy/drama series The Grimleys (1999–2001) as classical music teacher Neville Holder. For the series, Holder recorded acoustic versions of the Slade songs "Coz I Luv You", "Cum on Feel the Noize", "Mama Weer All Crazee Now" and "Everyday".

He had his own radio shows on Piccadilly 1152 and Key 103 in Manchester, which were syndicated around the country throughout the 1990s, then on Century and Capital Radio syndication from 2000 to 2004.

In 1996, Holder was the subject of the This Is Your Life TV show. He also presented 31 episodes of Noddy's Electric Ladyland, a surreal television quiz show. He was a team captain in BBC1's music series A Question of Pop and was immortalised as a puppet character Banger on the TV show Bob the Builder. In 1999, Holder's autobiography, Who's Crazee Now?, was published by Ebury. Updated in paperback in 2001 it is still available online. It was written by Holder with Lisa Verrico.

Holder was awarded the MBE in the 2000 honours list for his services to showbusiness. In 2001, he was awarded the Gold Badge of Merit by the British Academy of Composers and Songwriters. On 8 December 2000, Holder made a cameo appearance on a live episode of Granada Television's Coronation Street, marking the soap's 40th anniversary. He played a character called Stan, who was saving the street's cobbles from being replaced. Holder voiced the lift announcements at the Walsall New Art Gallery. In November 2004, he made a guest appearance in Peter Kay's Max and Paddy's Road to Nowhere, in which he played a garage mechanic called Mick Bustin. The scenes were filmed in Bolton. Also for the past 25 years Holder has voiced, sung and appeared in many adverts for TV, film and radio worldwide. In 2006, Holder made a guest appearance in a music video for the Misty's Big Adventure single, "Fashion Parade". Holder was a regular TV critic and contributor to The Radcliffe and Maconie Show on BBC Radio 2 for eight years, and the three often talked about rock star gossip from all eras. Radcliffe often refers to Holder as 'Sir Nodward of Holdershire'.

To celebrate his 50th year in showbiz, Holder toured the UK during May 2013 with Mark Radcliffe for a series of intimate 'In conversation with' shows. Venues for the spring part of the tour include Bolton, Leeds, Durham, Telford, Preston, Redditch, Buxton and Harrogate. During the majority of shows Holder performed some short acoustic numbers.

Holder was the third celebrity to be inducted onto the Birmingham Walk of Stars. 27,000 people turned out to his induction ceremony, which took place on 9 December 2007 at Birmingham's 2007 Canal Boat Light Parade. Since Christmas 2007, Holder has annually recorded a TV show countdown of hit Christmas tunes. He is the Nobby's Nuts mascot following on from a TV campaign. Holder also made an appearance on the 2008 Xmas edition of BBC's humorous news quiz show, Have I Got News for You as a member of Paul Merton's team. In January 2010, Holder and his wife appeared on All Star Mr & Mrs on ITV, where they won the £30,000 jackpot for the NSPCC charity. In 2011, Holder as 'King of the Sizzle' fronted British Sausage Week, touring the country to find the Best British Bangers and to promote support for British farmers and butchers. Holder featured as "Geoff's Dad" in the BBC Radio 4 comedy Hobby Bobbies. Series 1 was broadcast July/August 2013 and Series 2 November/December 2014.

On 24 June 2014, Holder was awarded the freedom of his home town of Walsall, making him an honorary freeman of the borough. On 25 September 2014, Holder released his second book via Constable, titled The World According to Noddy. In December 2015, he appeared as a presenter on BBC television's Songs of Praise. On Christmas Day 2015 Holder appeared in a cameo role in BBC television's Mrs Brown's Boys. In 2018, Holder appeared as a panelist on the Christmas special of BBC television's Would I Lie to You?

In November 2022, Holder was featured shouting the slogan "It's Christmas" from Slade's "Merry Xmas Everybody" song, in high street retailer Iceland's Christmas television advertising for their range of party foods, with a voice-over by actor Brian Blessed. The campaign followed a series of teasers posted on Iceland’s official social media channels and website featuring Holder with the hashtag #NotYetNoddy.

Personal life
Holder married dress designer Leandra Russell in 1976. They had two daughters and divorced in 1984. In 2004, Holder married television producer Suzan Price, with whom he has a son, Django (named after Django Reinhardt). Today, Holder lives in Prestbury, Cheshire.

In December 2021, Holder criticised High Speed 2 and claimed more trains could be added to the West Coast Main Line instead. One of Holder's houses is located in Cheshire, where the line will pass through.

Discography
 Slade discography

Bibliography
Noddy Holder: Who's Crazee Now? My Autobiography 1999 

The World According To Noddy: Life Lessons Learned In and Out of Rock & Roll 2014

Notes

References

External links
 
 
 

1946 births
Living people
20th-century English male singers
20th-century English singers
21st-century English male singers
21st-century English singers
British radio DJs
English rock guitarists
English rock singers
English male singer-songwriters
Glam rock musicians
Members of the Order of the British Empire
Musicians from the West Midlands (county)
People from Walsall
English male writers
Slade members